Callum Alex David Burton (born 15 August 1996) is an English professional footballer who plays as a goalkeeper for  side Plymouth Argyle. He also represented England up to under-18 level.

Club career

Shrewsbury Town
Born in Newport, Shropshire, Burton attended Adams' Grammar School. Formed at Shrewsbury Town, on 27 August 2013 he went to nearby Market Drayton Town of the Northern Premier League on a work experience loan. In September, he was loaned to Conference North team Workington, where he made one appearance, a 4–0 loss at Worcester City on 21 September. On 24 February 2014, he signed a two-year professional contract at Shrewsbury.

On 30 August 2014, Burton had his first call-up for Shrewsbury, remaining an unused substitute in their 2–0 home win over Luton Town in League Two. On 23 December, he went on an emergency loan to Conference Premier side Nuneaton Town. He made his debut three days later in a 4–4 home draw with A.F.C. Telford United. His two other appearances for the Warwickshire club were clean sheets: a 1–0 win at Altrincham on 28 December for the team's first away win of the season, and a goalless draw at Telford on 1 January 2015 for which BBC Sport credited him with the result.

On 17 January, Burton went to another team of the same division, Southport, on a month-long loan. He made his debut for the Merseyside club later that day, keeping a clean sheet in a goalless home draw against Chester; his three other games of his loan were all defeats.

Burton made his Shrewsbury Town, and Football League debut, on the final day of the 2015–16 season on 8 May, away at Swindon Town in League One. Shrewsbury lost the game 3–0 at the County Ground, with the first goal from the penalty spot. On 9 June, he extended his contract until 2018.

The following season, with Shrewsbury's two senior goalkeepers Jayson Leutwiler and Mark Halstead competing for a place in the first-team, Burton returned to former loan club Nuneaton Town on a half-season loan deal in August 2016, although this arrangement was ended prematurely on 30 September. He joined National League North side A.F.C. Telford United on an initial one-month loan deal in February 2017, which was later extended until the end of the 2016–17 season.

Hull City
On 26 July 2017,  Burton signed a one-year deal with newly relegated EFL Championship club Hull City for an undisclosed fee. Before making an appearance, he was loaned on 4 November to Salford City in the National League North for one month. He had his first matchday call-up for Hull on 10 March 2018 due to Allan McGregor's injury, and remained an unused substitute in the 4–3 home win over Norwich City. Later that month, he agreed to a new one-year contract.

On 24 August 2018, Burton went on loan to Chesterfield of the National League until 16 January 2019. He made his debut for the Spireites the next day in a 1–0 home loss to Barnet, and was praised by manager Martin Allen after the match. He was sent off on 5 January 2019  against Ebbsfleet United also at the Proact Stadium for giving away a penalty in added time; defender Will Evans saved it to guarantee a 3–3 draw.

He was released by Hull City at the end of the 2018–19 season.

Cambridge United
On 28 June 2019, Cambridge United announced that Burton had signed a two-year deal with the club. Mainly a backup to Dimitar Mitov, he did not play a league game until 29 December when the Bulgarian was in poor form; his debut was a 1–0 home win against Morecambe.

On 17 May 2021, Cambridge announced they would not be offering Burton a new contract and he was released from his contract

Plymouth Argyle 
On 24 June 2021, Burton signed for EFL League One side Plymouth Argyle. On 22 September 2022 Burton signed a contract extension until the summer of 2024.

On 4 February 2023, Burton made his League One debut for Argyle as a substitute for injured Michael Cooper in a 1-0 loss away against Sheffield Wednesday. Despite the goal before he came on, Burton went on to maintain a clean sheet for his appearance.

On 21 February 2023 Burton saved three successive penalties in a penalty shoot out in the EFL Trophy semi final against Cheltenham Town after the game ended 1-1. The result sent Argyle through to their first appearance in the EFL Trophy final and their third appearance at Wembley Stadium.

International career
Burton made his international debut for England under-16 in a win over Spain on 16 February 2012, keeping a clean sheet in Madrid. On 7 August that year, at the Nordic Tournament in Tórshavn in the Faroe Islands, he made his under-17 debut in a 4–2 win over Finland. His under-18 debut came on 14 October 2013 in a 4–0 win over Hungary at St George's Park, replacing Ted Smith for the final two minutes.

Style of play
Burton is a fan of German football, and as a child idolised Oliver Kahn and more recently Manuel Neuer and Marc-André ter Stegen, while also looking up to England goalkeeper Joe Hart, who also played for Shrewsbury Town.

Following the 2022-23 EFL Trophy semi final where he saved three successive penalties, Burton reflected on the life of a goalkeeper who primarily played as an unused substitute explaining: "If you're a goalkeeper that plays more games than you're on the bench for in your career, you've had a pretty top-drawer career - it's something that you've got to get your head around from early on. There's lots of things that have happened in my career that have made me mentally change my approach, and I think here it's a lot easier when the person ahead of you is doing so well because they just find their place in the team and Coops [Michael Cooper] has been amazing since I've joined".

Career statistics

References

External links
FA profile

1996 births
Living people
People from Newport, Shropshire
People educated at Adams' Grammar School
English footballers
England youth international footballers
Association football goalkeepers
Shrewsbury Town F.C. players
Market Drayton Town F.C. players
Workington A.F.C. players
Nuneaton Borough F.C. players
Southport F.C. players
AFC Telford United players
Hull City A.F.C. players
National League (English football) players
English Football League players
Salford City F.C. players
Chesterfield F.C. players
Cambridge United F.C. players
Plymouth Argyle F.C. players